Native speakers of Urdu are spread across South Asia. The vast majority of them are Muslims of the Hindi–Urdu Belt of northern India, followed by the Deccani people of the Deccan plateau in south-central India (who speak Deccani Urdu), the Muhajir people of Pakistan, Muslims in the Terai of Nepal and the Dhakaiyas of Old Dhaka in Bangladesh. The historical centres of Urdu speakers include Delhi and Lucknow, as well as the Deccan, and more recently, Karachi. Another defunct variety of the language was historically spoken in Lahore for centuries before the name "Urdu" first began to appear. However, little is known about this defunct Lahori variety as it has not been spoken for centuries.

History

Mughal Empire
As early as 1689, Europeans used the label "Moors dialect", which simply meant "Muslim", to describe Urdu, the language associated with the Muslims in North India, such as John Ovington, who visited India during the reign of Aurangzeb:

The language of the Moors is different from that of the ancient original inhabitants of India, but is oblig'd to these Gentiles for its characters. For though the Moors dialect is peculiar to themselves, yet it is destitute of Letters to express it; and therefore in all their Writings in their Mother Tongue, they borrow their letters from the Heathens, or from the Persians, or other Nations.

Fall of the Mughal Empire
Indian Muslim qasbas that developed in clusters in the rural areas around the centers of Muslim power in the Upper Doab and Rohilkhand were dominated by a literate and homogenous elite, who embraced a distinctive Indo-Persian style of culture.  This service gentry, performing both clerical and military service for the Mughal empire and its successor states, also invested in the land. Their cultural and literary patronage meant that urban places continued, even after the political decilne, to act as preservers of Indo-Persian traditions and values.

The end of Muslim rule saw a large number of unemployed Indian Muslim horsemen, who were employed in the army of the East India Company. Thus 75% of the cavalry branch of the British army was composed of a social group referred to as the "Hindustani Mahomedans". This included Indian Muslim Baradaris of the Urdu-Hindustani Belt such as the Ranghar(Rajput Muslims), Sheikhs, Sayyids, Mughals, and Indianized Pathans.  British officers such as Skinner, Gardner and Hearsay had become leaders of irregular cavalry that preserved the traditions of Mughal cavalry, which had a political purpose because it absorbed pockets of cavalrymen who might otherwise become disaffected plunderers. The Governor-general insisted that it was incumbent upon the British to "give military employment" to various north Indian Muslim soldiers, particularly those "formerly engaged in military service of the Native powers". The lingua franca spoken in the army was a form of Urdu referred to in colonial usage as "military Hindustani".

The Indian Rebellion of 1857 was initiated by the 3rd Bengal Light Cavalry in Meerut, which was composed mainly of Indian Muslims. The mutineers made for Delhi, where its garrison revolted, massacring its British population, and installed Bahadur Shah Zafar as its nominal leader. The spread of the word that the British had been expelled from Delhi, interpreted as the breakdown of British authority, acted as a catalyst for mutiny as well as revolt. Regiments in other parts of northern India only revolted after Delhi had fallen. British characterizations of Muslims as fanatics took the fore during and after the Great Rebellion, as well as produced the Indian Muslims as a unified, cogent group, who were easily agitated, aggressive, and inherently disloyal.

Urdu nationalism

In the 19th century, Sir Syed Ahmed Khan and his followers such as Mohsin-ul-Mulk further advocated for the adoption of Urdu as the language of Indian Muslims, and led organizations such as the Anjuman-i Taraqqi-i Urdu and Urdu Defence Association, which won popular support in the Aligarh Movement and the Deoband Movement. The Urdu language was used in the emergence of a political Muslim self-consciousness. Syed Ahmed Khan converted the existing cultural and religious entity among Indian Muslims into a separatist political force, throwing a Western cloak of nationalism over the Islamic concept of culture. The distinct sense of value, culture and tradition among Indian Muslims originated from the nature of Islamization of the Indian populace during the Muslim conquests in the Indian subcontinent.

Clans

The Biradari, literally translating to "brotherhood", is the word used for a social unit based on kinship such as tribe or clan. The chief of the Biradari is the "Sardar", who is usually an elder man annually elected as the greatest man in the Biradari. Decisions on important matters are taken only after consulting the Biradari, and once taken binding on every member, especially in rural life.

Bilgrami 

The Sadaat-i Bilgram are a tribe of Indian Muslim Sayyid families who inhabit the historic district of Bilgram in Hardoi District. The Bilgrami Sayyid were important power brokers in the southern part of Awadh, and remained an important and influential clan, throughout the Middle Ages. The Bilgrami Sayyids were supporters of the Indo-Muslim Shaikhzada faction of Munim Khan II during the reign of the Emperor Bahadur Shah I. When Ruh-ul-Amin Khan of Bilgram reportedly entered state service with only 60 horsemen and foot soldiers, the Grand Vizier Munim Khan created him a mansab of 6000 and made him his close associate.

In the 20th century, Syed Hussain Bilgrami was one of the early leaders of the Muslim League.

Barah 
The Barah tribe of Sayyids are an Indian Muslim community claiming Zaidi Sayyid descent who are named after the Barha country in Uttar Pradesh between Meerut and Saharanpur. Their settlements, known as Qasbas, are named Behra Sadaat. Due to their reputation for bravery, to the point of recklessness, the Barah tribe held the hereditary right to lead the vanguard of the Army of the Mughal Empire in every battle. 6 years after Aurangzeb's death, the Barha Sayyid nobles became highly influential in the Mughal Court under leadership of the Sayyid Brothers, Qutb-ul-Mulk and Hussain Ali Khan, who became de-facto sovereigns of the empire when they began to make and unmake emperors. The Sayyids had developed a sort of common brotherhood among themselves and took up the cause of every individual as an insult to the whole group and an infringement to the rights of Sayyids in general.

In the 20th century, Mohsin-ul-Mulk founded the Urdu Defence Association, or the Anjuman-i Taraqqi-i Urdu, committed to the perpetuation of the Urdu language.

Ansari 

The Ansaris who claim origin from the 13th century descendants of Khwaja Abdullah Pir Haravi inhabited the town of Panipat. Prominent Ansaris in the pre-modern era include Lutfullah Khan Sadiq, the governor of Shahjahanabad under the Mughal Emperor Muhammad Shah. His brother Sher Afkan Panipati posessed an armed train composed solely of Indian Muslims or Hindustanis. In the modern era, the Urdu poet Altaf Hussain Hali, wrote the book Musaddas-e Hali is considered by Pakistani scholars as an important text leading to the development of the Pakistan Movement.

Ranghar 

The Ranghar were classified as an "agricultural tribe" by the British Raj administration and were recruited heavily in the British Indian Army, especially in Skinner's Horse.

Barabasti 
Barabasti refers to a Biradari of Indian Pathans named after their origin from twelve villages known as Barah Basti in Bulandshahr, where "Barah" means "twelve" in Hindustani, similar to the naming of the Indian Muslim Barah Sayyids of Muzaffarnagar. Like other Pathan colonists in Northern India, they are quite Indian in language, manners and appearance. In the War of 1857, Abdul Latif Khan of Khanpur, the head of the Barah Basti Pathans raised the standard of revolt against the East India Company, writing a petition to the Mughal Emperor Bahadur Shah Zafar promising to come to the Dehli court, and to bring some elephants with him, representing that he had been unwell. Nawab Walidad Khan of Malagarh occupied Aligarh and Khurja and attracted to his standard the fanatic Muslims of Barah Basti community from which many of the sowars of the Irregular Cavalry were recruited, along with the Sayyids of Shikarpur, and his 'near relation' Ismail Khan, who was the kotwal of Meerut and had served in the Skinner's Horse.

Lalkhani 
The Lalkhanis are Muslim Rajput converts from the Bargujar tribe, who assimilated to Lalkhani identity after their conversion. The Lalkhanis held estates in the districts of Bulandshahr. Nahar Ali Khan, who received the Taluqa of Pitampur from the Emperor Shah Alam II in 1774, offered resistance against the East India Company with his nephew Dunde Khan. Mir Muhammad Baquar Ali Khan was the Raja Of Pindrawal while Nawab Saeed-ul-Mulk Chhatari, the last Prime Minister of the Nizam of Hyderabad,  was one of the most prominent politicians of the All-India Muslim League.

Gardezi  

The Gardezi tribe of Manikpur are an Indian community of Sayyids who had settled in Manikpur since the 12th century. In the 1700s, Raji Muhammad Khan who belonged to the Gardezi tribe of Manikpur was the Mir-i-Atish, or artillery chief, of the Mughal Emperor Jahandar Shah.

Culture

Qasbas
In Urdu, the word kasaba refers to a settlement larger than a village but smaller than a city; in short, a town. In India, a qasbah is a small town distinguished by the presence of Muslim families of rank.

Cuisine
Cultural affinity meant that Indo-Persian influence played a large role in the making of Indo-Muslim cuisine in Northern India. Characteristic ingredients of this cuisine include onions and garlic, spices such as cloves, cardamom, nutmeg, mace, back pepper and cinnamon, and use of yoghurt, cream and butter. Special dishes include biryani, qorma, kofta, seekh kabab, nihari, haleem, Nargisi koftay, roghani naan, naan, sheer-khurma (dessert), and chai (sweet, milky tea).

Geographic distribution

Although the majority of Urdu-speakers reside in Pakistan (including 30 million native speakers, and up to 94 million second-language speakers), where Urdu is the national and official language, most speakers who use Urdu as their native tongue live in northern India, where it is one of 22 official languages.

The Urdu-speaking community is also present in other parts of the subcontinent with a historical Muslim presence, such as the Deccanis, the Biharis and Dhakaiyas (who speak Dhakaiya Urdu) in Bangladesh, the Urdu-speaking members of the Madheshi community in Nepal, some Muslims in Sri Lanka and a section of Burmese Indians. Many people of Pashtun origin are also diversely scattered and principally settled in the plains of northern and central India, known as the Pathans.  The majority of Indian Pathans are Urdu-speaking people, who have assimilated into the local society over the course of generations. Following the 1947 Partition of India, a large number of these Urdu-speaking communities migrated to Pakistan along with other Indian Muslims, who are known as Muhajirs.  

In addition, there are Urdu-speakers present amongst the South Asian diaspora, most notably in the Middle East, North America (notably the United States and Canada), Europe (notably the United Kingdom), the Caribbean region, Africa (notably South Africa and Mauritius), Southeast Asia (notably Singapore) and Oceania (notably Australia and Fiji). Other communities, most notably the Punjabi elite of Pakistan, have adopted Urdu as a mother tongue and identify with both an Urdu speaker as well as Punjabi identity.

See also
 Muhajir (Pakistan)
 Urdu speakers by country
 States of India by Urdu speakers

Notes

References

External links
 
 

 
Muhajir communities
Ethnic groups in Pakistan
 
Linguistic groups of the constitutionally recognised official languages of India